Jean-Yves Verd'hurt (born c. 1940) is a retired French property agent and amateur Egyptologist.

In September 2004, he claimed, along with his colleague Gilles Dormion, to have discovered a corridor inside the Great Pyramid of Giza which he believes could lead directly to the burial chamber of Pharaoh Khufu.

External links
 The ultimate secrets of the Pyramid (September 2000)
 A secret chamber in the Great Pyramid? (Science Actualités)

French archaeologists
1940s births
Living people